WQDR may refer to:

 WQDR (AM), a radio station (570 AM) licensed to Raleigh, North Carolina
 WQDR-FM, a radio station (94.7 FM) licensed to Raleigh, North Carolina, United States